Jorge Luis Rivera (born March 24, 1996) is a Puerto Rican footballer who plays as a midfielder for Don Bosco FC in the Liga Puerto Rico.

Playing career

Club

Guayama FC
Rivera played club football for Guayama FC in the 2015 season.

Puerto Rico FC
On February 26, 2016, Rivera joined the newly created Puerto Rico FC, that set to begin play in the NASL's 2016 fall season.

The 20-year-old starter started four games, came in as a substitute in five and played 343 minutes in the 2016 season. Also scored his first two goals as a professional during the Luis Villarejo Cup. On January 27, 2017, PRFC announced the resigning of Jorge Rivera.

Penn FC
In February 2018, Rivera signed with Penn FC in the United Soccer League.

Don Bosco FC
In January 2019, Rivera returned to Puerto Rico to play with Don Bosco FC in the Liga Puerto Rico. He scored his first goal on January 12 against Bayamón FC.

International
Rivera made his senior international debut for Puerto Rico in 2015.

On March 26, 2016, Rivera scores his first goal for Puerto Rico national football team against Anguilla in the 42' minute of a 2017 Caribbean Cup qualification match.

Career statistics

Club

International

Statistics accurate as of match played Junee 13, 2017

International goals
Scores and results list Puerto Rico's goal tally first.

Honors
Puerto Rico FC
Copa Luis Villarejo: 2016

References

External links 
 

1996 births
Living people
Puerto Rican footballers
Puerto Rico international footballers
Puerto Rico FC players
Association football midfielders
Penn FC players
USL Championship players
North American Soccer League players